The Blackburn Mercury was an early British aircraft designed as a pilot trainer for the Blackburn Flying School, Filey, in 1911. It was an enlarged, two-seat version of the Second Monoplane that flew earlier that year. It was a mid-wing monoplane of conventional configuration that accommodated pilot and student in tandem, open cockpits. 
This prototype was displayed at the Olympia Aero Show in March 1911, and led to orders being placed for two racers to participate in the Daily Mail Circuit of Britain race. The first of these crashed on takeoff, and the second was first rebuilt into a two-seat trainer, then into a single-seat trainer known as the Type B. Another six Mercuries were built for various private buyers.

A full-scale non-flying replica of Mercury II configuration was constructed for the Yorkshire Television series Flambards and is now displayed at the Yorkshire Air Museum.

Variants
 Mercury I – two-seat prototype powered by Isaacson engine (one built)
 Mercury II – single-seat racer version with Gnome rotary engine (two built)
 Type B – one Mercury II converted to single-seat trainer
 Mercury III or Mercury Passenger Type – (six built) two-seaters powered by a variety of Isaacson, Gnome, Renault and Anzani engines

Specifications (Mercury I)

Notes

References

 
 
 
 
 Yorkshire Air Museum website
 Blackburn Mercury – British Aircraft Directory

1910s British civil trainer aircraft
Mercury
High-wing aircraft
Single-engined tractor aircraft
Aircraft first flown in 1911